Wade Patrick Elliott (born 14 December 1978) is an English former professional footballer who is currently head coach of EFL League One club Cheltenham Town. He played mainly as a right midfielder but could also play as a central midfielder.

Elliott began playing football as a youth player for Southampton before joining non-league Bashley. He began his professional career at AFC Bournemouth after joining from Bashley for £5,000. After five years he joined Burnley where he won two player of the year awards and scored the only goal in the 2009 play-off final elevating his team to the Premier League. He moved on to Birmingham City in 2011, playing regularly for two seasons. He spent time on loan at Bristol City in 2014, and joined them on a permanent contract after his release from Birmingham at the end of the 2013–14 season.

Having achieved promotion from League One to the Championship with Bristol City in the 2014–15 season, Elliott retired from playing in June 2015 in order to take up a coaching role at the club. After leaving Bristol City in June 2016 Elliot played in several pre-season Friendlies for National League side Forest Green Rovers, reportedly in advance of taking a joint role of player and youth team coach.

Playing career

Youth and non-League
Elliott was born in Southampton, and began playing football as a youth player at Southampton F.C., during which time he also represented England schoolboys. He was released from the Southampton youth setup when he was 16 and instead went on to do his A-levels. He carried on playing football at non-League Bashley while studying at university – he did two years of a degree course in communications and sociology at Goldsmiths' College and completed the degree via the Open University – and was spotted by former AFC Bournemouth player Jimmy Case who organised a trial match for him at the League One club. He trained with Bournemouth from Christmas 1998, and signed for a fee of £5,000 in February 2000.

AFC Bournemouth
Elliott scored three goals in the twelve games he played in his first season with Bournemouth. In the following seasons he began to have more and more of an impact, winning the club's Player of the Year award in his first full season. He was out of contract at the end of the 2003–04 season and eventually signed a one-year contract extension. In his last season at the club he played 51 games and scored 5 goals. With his and teammate Garreth O'Connor's contracts due to expire, the pair signed three-year contracts with Burnley, a team which he had impressed in an FA Cup-tie that season.

Burnley

Elliott's first season at Burnley got off to a slow start; he made just 23 starts for the club and scored 3 goals. However, in his next two seasons, he became one of the club's most influential players, winning Player of the Year awards for two consecutive seasons. In the 2007–08 season, he committed his future to the club by signing a three-year contract extension, keeping him at the club until the end of the 2011 season. In the following season he was instrumental in Burnley's promotion to the Premier League and capped off the season by scoring the only goal in the play-off final. The  curling shot captured much media attention with multiple references to him scoring the goal that had the potential to earn Burnley up to £60 million in the Premier League. Elliott began his first Premier League season in the headlines by scoring the only goal in the home win against Everton. On his 200th League appearance for Burnley, he scored the final goal in a 4–1 defeat of Hull City from an inswinging free kick on the far left at the KC Stadium.

Birmingham City
Elliott joined Championship club Birmingham City on 31 August 2011, the last day of the summer transfer window; he signed a two-year contract for an undisclosed fee. He made his Birmingham debut as a second-half substitute in a 3–0 home victory against Millwall, and scored his first goal for the club against Maribor in the Europa League on 29 September. Elliott's first league goal came in March 2012 in a 3–1 defeat away to Leicester City, scored from the penalty spot after Sol Bamba brought down Nikola Žigić. His third league goal came in a win against Peterborough United in September; the goal was originally credited as an own goal when goalkeeper Bobby Olejnik punched Elliott's free kick into his own net, but was later awarded to Elliott. In June 2013, Elliott signed a one-year contract extension with Birmingham.

In October 2013, Elliott was sent off for elbowing an opponent just before half-time with Birmingham a goal down to Premier League Stoke City in the League Cup; the ten men came back to draw 4–4 after extra time but lost the penalty shootout. He returned from the resulting three-match suspension to make his 100th appearance for Birmingham, as a second-half substitute in a 3–0 win at Barnsley on 30 November. After a spell on loan at Bristol City, Elliott was released. He finished his Birmingham career at the age of 35, having scored 14 goals in 105 appearances in all competitions.

Bristol City
After not featuring regularly in Birmingham's starting eleven, Elliott joined League One club Bristol City on 28 January 2014 on a one-month loan. He made his debut the same day, as a half-time substitute at Brentford with his new team already 3–1 behind, and was booked early in the half for a poor tackle. He went on to impress manager Steve Cotterill, who admitted that he had "[thrown] him in too soon after not playing regular first team football since October", and Elliott's loan was extended to the end of the season.

After his release from Birmingham, Elliott joined Bristol City on a one-year permanent contract. Cotterill appointed him captain, describing him as "a stand-out candidate" who "offers a great deal of honesty, integrity and leadership." He led his side to the "lower-league double" of the Football League Trophy and League One title, then announced his retirement as a player to take up coaching.

Coaching career
Elliott took up the post of under-21s manager at Bristol City at the end of the 2014–15 season. In January 2016, after Steve Cotterill was sacked, assistant manager John Pemberton and Elliott were named as an interim management team; their first game in charge was a 1–0 victory over league leaders Middlesbrough. He left the club at the end of the season following a reorganisation of the coaching structure under new manager Lee Johnson.

In October 2016, Elliott was announced as the new assistant Academy manager at Forest Green Rovers. Elliott was appointed assistant manager of Stoke City U23s in April 2017. He became manager of the team in January 2018 following the departure of Glyn Hodges, but reverted to assistant to Kevin Russell for the 2018–19 season.

Elliot joined Cheltenham Town as a coach in September 2020. Elliott was promoted to the role of head coach in June 2022 following the departure of Michael Duff.

Career statistics

Managerial statistics

Honours

Player
Burnley
 Championship (level 2) play-off winners: 2008–09

Bristol City
 League One (level 3): 2014–15
 Football League Trophy: 2014–15

Coach
Cheltenham Town
EFL League Two champions: 2020–21

References

External links

1978 births
Living people
People from Eastleigh
English footballers
England schools international footballers
Association football midfielders
Bashley F.C. players
AFC Bournemouth players
Burnley F.C. players
Birmingham City F.C. players
Bristol City F.C. players
Southern Football League players
English Football League players
Premier League players
Bristol City F.C. non-playing staff
Forest Green Rovers F.C. non-playing staff
Stoke City F.C. non-playing staff
Alumni of Goldsmiths, University of London
Cheltenham Town F.C. non-playing staff
Association football coaches
Cheltenham Town F.C. managers
English Football League managers